Yiannos Papantoniou (born 27 July 1949) is a former member of the National Parliament in Greece (MP) from 1988 to 2007, Minister of National Defense (2001−03), Minister of Economy and Finance (1994−2001). During his time as Economy and Finance Minister, he worked closely with his Economic and Financial Affairs Council partners to prepare for the launch of the Euro in Greece. For his achievements he was 'highly commended' by Euromoney magazine in September 1998 as Finance Minister of the Year. Prior to this, Papantoniou worked at the OECD (1978–81), served as a Member of the European Parliament (MEP) from 1981 to 1984, and as Advisor to the Greek Prime Minister on EEC Affairs and Integration. He was elected as chairman of the board of Governors of the European Bank for Reconstruction and Development (EBRD) in 1999. From 2009 to 2010, he was Visiting Senior Fellow in the Hellenic Observatory within the European Institute at the London School of Economics and Political Science. Papantoniou has published numerous articles and books on topics related to economic and political developments in Greece, Europe and the wider world scene. In November 2014, Papantoniou was convicted by an Athens court of failing to declare 1.2 million euros in a Swiss bank account held under his wife's name. In July 2017, he has filed an appeal to the European court of human rights against this decision.

He is currently the President of the Centre for Progressive Policy Research (KEPP), an independent think-tank.

On 24 October 2018, upon decision of the prosecuting authorities, Papantoniou and his wife were detained and sent to Korydallos prison, pending their trial for grave corruption and money-laundering charges, the losses for the Greek State being estimated at 400 million Euro.

On 7 April 2020 Yannos Papantoniou was released from temporary detention upon decision of a Judicial Council that stated that insufficient evidence was provided for sending the case to trial and ordered the investigating authorities to search for supplementary evidence through seeking further depositions.

See also
List of National Economy Ministers (1982–2000)
List of Ministers of Finance (1967–2000)
List of Economy and Finance Ministers (2000–2009)

Notes and references

External links

 
  Essay by Papantoniou defending the accession of Greece to the EMU.
 
 Centre for Progressive Policy Research
Terms of office of Yiannos Papantoniou on the website of the Hellenic Parliament
 

1949 births
Living people
PASOK politicians
Government ministers of Greece
Ministers of National Defence of Greece
Finance ministers of Greece
Alumni of the University of Cambridge
Greek MPs 1985–1989
Greek MPs 1989 (June–November)
Greek MPs 1990–1993
Greek MPs 1993–1996
Greek MPs 1996–2000
Greek MPs 2000–2004
Greek MPs 2004–2007
MEPs for Greece 1981–1984
PASOK MEPs
Alumni of Queens' College, Cambridge
Greek politicians convicted of crimes
Politicians from Paris